West Stanly High School is a public high school located at 306 East Red Cross Rd. in Oakboro, North Carolina, United States. The school is part of the Stanly County Schools district. Its official mascot is the Colt.

History
In 1962, four county high schools—Stanfield, Ridgecrest, Oakboro and Endy—combined to form what is known as West Stanly High School. The class of 1963 was the first graduating class.

West Stanly Middle School
In the school year 2011–12, Stanly County Schools opened West Stanly Middle School. It was formed out of the upper grades of multiple elementary schools in the western area of Stanly County. It is housed in the school building formerly occupied by Running Creek Elementary School, which was dissolved by the middle school's opening. Started as only a 7–8 school, WSMS added 6th grade the following school year.

Notable alumni
Rod Broadway – American football coach, currently the head football coach at North Carolina A&T State University
Quan Sturdivant – American football linebacker, currently a free agent.
B. J. Hill – American football defensive end, currently on the Cincinnati Bengals.

See also
 Stanly County, North Carolina

References

Schools in Stanly County, North Carolina
Public high schools in North Carolina
1963 establishments in North Carolina
Educational institutions established in 1963